Ioah Guyot is a seamount in the Pacific Ocean, close to the Marshall Islands. Part of the Magellan Seamounts, it is a shield volcano that has erupted alkali basalt and hawaiite 87 million years ago, but may have continued erupting into the Miocene. During the Cretaceous, reefs developed on the guyot.

Geography and geomorphology 

The guyot belongs to the Magellan Seamounts which stretch from the Mariana Trench to Ita Mai Tai seamount. It is also known as Fedorov and Ioan/ IOAN, which stands for "Institute of Oceanology of the Academy of Sciences of the USSR". Ita Mai Tai guyot lies south-southeast of Ioah and Pallada guyot north-northwest, other seamounts in the area east of Ioah are Changpogo, Gramberg, Zatonskii and Arirang. There are about 1000 seamounts in the central western Pacific.

The lower slopes are gentle but steepen between  depth. Only the lower slopes are covered with thick sediment layers; the upper slopes have sediment accumulations only in sheltered areas and also feature step-like structures. A number of volcanic cones grew on Ioah and form morphostructures, with a density of about 11.1 vents per . Some of these vents form alignments and Ioah lies at the intersection of two strike-slip faults. The seamount rises from the East Mariana Basin over Jurassic seafloor, between the two Ogasawara Fracture Zones.

Composition 

Volcanic rocks found on Ioah Guyot include alkali basalt, tholeiite and hawaiite, plus ankaramite, phonolite and trachybasalt; as well as zeolites formed by hydrothermal processes. Breccia and sandstones cover the exposed rocks and formed through the breakup of basaltic rocks. Reef limestones and other carbonates were emplaced on the seamount, followed during the Eocene-Pleistocene by pelagic sediments. Clay deposits on the slopes and turbidites have also been reported.

Some of these ferromanganese deposits form nodules encased within limestones. Spherules of cosmic origin have been found.

History 

The seamount developed about 87 million years ago on the Pacific Plate and is now extinct; its estimated age is placed in a range between 88.5 and 86.2 million years.  It was located in the Southern Hemisphere as it formed. Some secondary volcanic cones may be much younger, of Miocene age. The formation of Ioah and the other Magellan Seamounts has been explained by a hotspot that would now be located close to the Rarotonga hotspot, Samoa hotspot and Society hotspot were it still active. Compositionally, volcanic rocks from Ioah resemble these of the Rarotonga hotspot.

During the Aptian-Cenomanian, limestones and volcanic rocks formed sediments on Ioah Guyot which developed a reef system. A secondary reefal phase occurred during Santonian to Maastrichtian times and a third one during the Eocene. During the Eocene, tuffs were emplaced on the seamount. Ferromanganese crusts developed later during the Paleogene and Miocene-Pleistocene, and up to  sediments accumulated on the summit plateau.

Biology 

Species that lived on Ioah Guyot during the Cretaceous include ammonoids, belemnites, bivalves, bryozoans, cephalopods, corals, crinoids, foraminifera, gastropods, rudists, sea pens,  sea urchins and sponges. Presently, a rich fauna has been identified on Ioah Guyot, including scleractinian corals without zooxanthelles such as Fungiacyathus pliciseptus and Peponocyathus australiensis which is usually found in much shallower waters.

See also 

 Pako Guyot
 Vlinder Guyot

References

Sources 

 
 
 
 
 
 
 
 
  	
 
 
 

Cretaceous volcanoes
Miocene volcanoes
Seamounts of the Pacific Ocean